This list of sport awards is an index to articles about notable medals, prizes, and other awards in the field of sport. It is organized by sport. For a given sport, awards are often given for the best players or teams in each country.

General and miscellaneous 

BBC Sports Personality of the Year:
BBC Overseas Sports Personality of the Year
BBC Sports Personality of the Year Coach Award
BBC Sports Personality of the Year Helen Rollason Award
BBC Sports Personality of the Year Lifetime Achievement Award
BBC Sports Personality Team of the Year Award
BBC Sports Unsung Hero Award
BBC Young Sports Personality of the Year
Egebergs Ærespris – to athletes who excel in more than one sport (Norway)
ESPY Awards
Golden Globes (Portugal)
James E. Sullivan Award – to outstanding amateur athletes in the United States (Amateur Athletic Union)
Kids' Choice Sports Awards
Laureus World Sports Awards
NACDA Directors' Cup – to the colleges and universities with the most success in collegiate athletics (National Association of Collegiate Directors of Athletics)
NXT Year-End Awards
Olympic Cup – to an institution or association with a record of merit and integrity in actively developing the Olympic movement (International Olympic Committee)
Slammy Awards
List of sports awards honoring women

American football and Canadian football 

Associated Press College Football Player of the Year – to the most outstanding collegiate football player in the United States (Associated Press)
Grey Cup – to the champions of the Canadian Football League
Heisman Trophy – to outstanding college football players whose performance best exhibits the pursuit of excellence with integrity (Heisman Trophy Trust)
Pro Football Hall of Fame
Vince Lombardi Trophy – to the winning team of the National Football League's championship game, the Super Bowl

Association football 

A–E

Albo Panchina d'Oro – to the best Italian coach of the Serie A
Best European Goalkeeper
Best Male Soccer Player ESPY Award
Best Soccer Player ESPY Award
Bota de Prata – to the top scorer in the Portuguese Primeira Liga
Brian Clough Trophy – to the winners of any league, cup or friendly match between Derby County and Nottingham Forest
CAF Clubs of the 20th Century – a ranking of the most successful clubs of the 20th century in Africa
CNID Awards – to players and coaches in the Portuguese Primeira Liga and to Portuguese players and coaches in other countries
Coach of the Year (Romania)
Copa Libertadores – to the winners of the Copa Libertadores
Copa Sudamericana – to the winners of the Copa Sudamericana
CSL Golden Boot – to the top goalscorer in the Canadian Soccer League
Det Gyldne Bur – to the best goalkeeper in Danish football
DZFoot d'Or – to the Algerian player considered to have performed the best over the previous year
European Champion Clubs' Cup – to the winners of the UEFA Champions League
European Golden Shoe – to the leading goalscorer in league matches from the top division of every European national league

F

FA Cup – to the winners of the FA Cup
FAM Football Awards (Malaysia)
FIFA Ballon d'Or – given annually to the player who is considered to have performed the best in the previous season
FIFA Clubs of the 20th Century – a ranking of the most successful clubs of the 20th century
FIFA Development Award – for the development of football in countries judged to need it most
FIFA Fair Play Award – for exemplary civil or sporting behavior
FIFA Order of Merit – for significant contributions to football
FIFA Player of the Century – to the greatest player of the 20th century
FIFA Presidential Award
FIFA Puskás Award – to the player judged to have scored the most aesthetically significant and "most beautiful" goal of the year
FIFA World Cup All-Time Team – an all-star squad published in 1994 and composed of some of the best players of all time
FIFA World Cup awards
FIFA World Cup Dream Team – an all-star squad published in 2002 and composed of some of the best players of all time
FIFA World Cup – to the winners of the FIFA World Cup
FIFA World Player of the Year – to the players who were thought to be the best in the world; replaced by the FIFA Ballon d'Or
Footballer of the Year (Argentina)
Footballer of the Year (Austria)
Footballer of the Year (Azerbaijan)
Footballer of the Year (Baltic and Commonwealth of Independent States)
Footballer of the Year (Belgium)
Footballer of the Year (Bulgaria)
Footballer of the Year (Chile)
Footballer of the Year (Croatia)
Footballer of the Year (Czech Republic)
Footballer of the Year (Czechoslovakia)
Footballer of the Year (Denmark)
Footballer of the Year (Estonia)
Footballer of the Year (Finland)
Footballer of the Year (Georgia)
Footballer of the Year (Germany)
Footballer of the Year (Ireland, Republic of)
Footballer of the Year (Israel)
Footballer of the Year (Kazakhstan)
Footballer of the Year (Latvia)
Footballer of the Year (Liechtenstein)
Footballer of the Year (Lithuania)
Footballer of the Year (Luxembourg)
Footballer of the Year (Macedonia)
Footballer of the Year (Moldova)
Footballer of the Year (Netherlands)
Footballer of the Year (Norway)
Footballer of the Year (Paraguay)
Footballer of the Year (Portugal)
Footballer of the Year (Romania)
Footballer of the Year – given by Futbol (Russia)
Footballer of the Year – given by Sport-Express (Russia)
Footballer of the Year (Serbia)
Footballer of the Year (Slovakia)
Footballer of the Year (Soviet Union)
Footballer of the Year (Sweden)
Footballer of the Year (Switzerland)
Foreign Footballer of the Year (Romania)
Football Manager of the Year (Germany)

G–M

Goal of the Month (Germany)
Goal of the Year (Germany)
Golden Ball (Czech Republic)
Golden Ball (Portugal)
Golden Foot – to players who stand out for their athletic achievements and personality
Guerin d'Oro – to the player in the Italian Serie A with at least 19 games played who has obtained the best average media rating
Heart of Hajduk Award – to Croatian club HNK Hajduk Split's best player
Hong Kong Top Footballer Awards
IFFHS World's Best Goalkeeper
Iran football awards
Lennart Johanssons Pokal – to the winners of the Swedish Allsvenskan
MLS Golden Boot – to Major League Soccer's regular season leading scorer

N–Z

Norwegian Football Association Gold Watch – to players who reach 25 caps for the Norwegian national team
NTF football awards – to players and coaches in Norwegian football
Oscar del Calcio – to players and coaches in Italian football
Pallone d'Argento – to the Serie A player deemed to have displayed the best civil and sporting behavior over the previous season
Piłka Nożna plebiscite awards – to players and coaches in Polish football
Premier League Golden Boot – to the top goalscorer at the end of the Premier League season
Prva HNL Player of the Year – to the best player in Croatian football
PSAP Awards (Greece):
PSL Awards (South Africa):
PSL Club Rookie of the Year
PSL Coach of the Season
PSL Footballer of the Year
PSL Goalkeeper of the Season
PSL Player of the Season
PSL Players' Player of the Season
PSL Referee of the Season
Rinus Michels Awards (Netherlands)
Silver Ball – for the best goal scored for the Estonian national team
Sportske Novosti award – to the best player in the world (Croatia)
Sportske novosti Yellow Shirt award – to the best player in the Croatian Prva HNL
Ubaldo Fillol Award – to the goalkeeper with the lowest goals-to-games ratio in the Argentine Primera División
UEFA Best Player in Europe
UEFA Cup – to the winners of the UEFA Europa League
Women's Professional Soccer awards
World Team of the 20th Century – an all-star squad published in 1998 and composed of some of the best players of all time
Young Player of the Year (Ireland, Republic of)

Australian rules football 

AFL Army Award – to players who produce significant acts of bravery or selflessness to promote the cause of their team during a game
AFL Rising Star – to a standout young player in the Australian Football League
AFL Players Association awards – a group of awards given annually to players in the Australian Football League, voted for by all AFL players
All-Australian team – an all-star team of Australian rules footballers selected by a panel at the end of each season
Brownlow Medal – to the "fairest and best" player in the Australian Football League during the regular season as determined by votes cast by the officiating field umpires after each game
Coleman Medal – to the Australian Football League player who kicks the most goals in regular-season matches in that year
Goal of the Year – for the best goal of the season
Herald Sun Player of the Year – a media award for the Australian Football League given by Melbourne newspaper the Herald Sun
Jock McHale Medal – to the coach of the winning premiership team in the Australian Football League
Leigh Matthews Trophy – to the most valuable player in the Australian Football League
Lou Richards Medal – to the best player in the Australian Football League as voted on by the Sunday Footy Show panel
Mark of the Year – for the best mark of the season. A mark is the action of a player cleanly catching a kicked ball that has travelled more than 15 metres (49 ft) without the ball hitting the ground
Michael Tuck Medal – to the "fairest and best" player in the AFL Pre-season Cup Final
Norm Smith Medal – given in the AFL Grand Final to the player adjudged by an independent panel of experts to have been the best player in the match

Auto racing 

Astor Cup – originally awarded to Astor Challenge Cup winners (1915-1916), now awarded to the IndyCar Series champion.
Borg-Warner Trophy – to the champion of the Indianapolis 500
Gordon Bennett Cup – a defunct trophy to be raced for annually by the automobile clubs of various countries
Harley J. Earl Trophy – to the champion of the Daytona 500
Sprint Cup – to the championship winner of the Sprint Cup Series of NASCAR
The Wally – to the winners of a national event of the National Hot Rod Association
Vanderbilt Cup – the first major trophy in American auto racing

Baseball 

Baseball Hall of Fame (disambiguation)
Commissioner's Trophy – to the Major League Baseball team that wins the World Series
Cy Young Award – to the best pitchers in Major League Baseball
Gold Glove Award – to the Major League Baseball players judged to have exhibited superior individual fielding performances at each fielding position
Manager of the Year Award – to the best managers in Major League Baseball
Most Valuable Player Award – to the regular-season most valuable players in Major League Baseball
Olympic medalists
Rookie of the Year Award – to Major League Baseball's best regular-season rookies

Basketball 

European awards:
Euroscar
FIBA Europe Player of the Year Award
Mr. Europa
Naismith Memorial Basketball Hall of Fame
National Basketball Association awards:
Bill Russell NBA Finals MVP
NBA Coach of the Year
NBA Defensive Player of the Year
NBA Executive of the Year
NBA Most Valuable Player
NBA Rookie of the Year
NBA Sixth Man of the Year
U.S. college basketball awards:
Men and women:
Frances Pomeroy Naismith Award
Wooden Award
Naismith Award
NCAA basketball tournament Most Outstanding Player
Carol Eckman Award
Women only:
Nancy Lieberman Award
Wade Trophy
Women's National Basketball Association awards:
Kim Perrot Sportsmanship Award
WNBA Coach of the Year
WNBA Defensive Player of the Year
WNBA Most Valuable Player
WNBA Rookie of the Year
WNBA Sixth Woman of the Year

Beach soccer 
Beach Soccer Stars

Boxing 

Golden Gloves
Lonsdale Belt
Olympic medalists

Cricket 

Allan Border Medal
Cricket World Cup – to the winners of the Cricket World Cup
ICC Awards (International Cricket Council)
The Ashes – the oldest prize in international cricket, played since 1882
Wisden Cricketers of the Year (Wisden Cricketers' Almanack)

Cycling 
UCI Women's Road World Cup

Figure skating 

European Figure Skating Championships
Four Continents Figure Skating Championships
United States Figure Skating Championships
World Figure Skating Championships

Golf 

Curtis Cup
Eisenhower Trophy
Presidents Cup
Ryder Cup
Solheim Cup
Walker Cup

Horse racing 

Ascot Gold Cup (UK)
Auckland Cup (New Zealand)
Ayr Gold Cup (UK)
Caulfield Cup (Australia)
Cheltenham Gold Cup (UK)
Cox Plate (Australia)
Geraldton Gold Cup (Australia)
Hollywood Gold Cup (USA)
Melbourne Cup (Australia)
Queen's Plate (Canada)

Ice hockey

North America 

Allan Cup
Art Ross Trophy
Bill Masterton Memorial Trophy
Calder Cup
Calder Memorial Trophy
Clarence S. Campbell Bowl
Conn Smythe Trophy
Frank J. Selke Trophy
Hart Memorial Trophy
Hobey Baker Award
Jack Adams Award
James Norris Memorial Trophy
King Clancy Memorial Trophy
Lady Byng Memorial Trophy
Les Cunningham Award
Lester Patrick Trophy
Maurice "Rocket" Richard Trophy
Memorial Cup
NHL Plus-Minus Award
Patty Kazmaier Award
Presidents' Trophy
Prince of Wales Trophy
Roger Crozier Saving Grace Award
Stanley Cup
Ted Lindsay Award
Turner Cup
Vezina Trophy
William M. Jennings Trophy

Sweden 

Guldhjälmen
Guldpucken
Viking Award

Lacrosse 

Champion's Cup
Ensign C. Markland Kelly, Jr. Award
Founders Cup
Jack Turnbull Award
Les Bartley Award
Les Bartley Award (Toronto Rock)
Lt. Raymond Enners Award
Major League Lacrosse Coach of the Year Award
Major League Lacrosse Defensive Player of the Year Award
Major League Lacrosse Goaltender of the Year Award
Major League Lacrosse Most Improved Player of the Year Award
Major League Lacrosse MVP Award
Major League Lacrosse Offensive Player of the Year Award
Major League Lacrosse Rookie of the Year Award
Major League Lacrosse Sportsman of the Year Award
Major League Lacrosse Weekly Awards
Mann Cup
McLaughlin Award
Minto Cup
National Lacrosse League Defensive Player of the Year Award
National Lacrosse League Executive of the Year Award
National Lacrosse League GM of the Year Award
National Lacrosse League Goaltender of the Year Award
National Lacrosse League Monthly Awards
National Lacrosse League MVP Award
National Lacrosse League Rookie of the Year Award
National Lacrosse League Sportsmanship Award
National Lacrosse League Weekly Awards
Presidents Cup
Schmeisser Award
Steinfeld Cup
Tewaaraton Trophy
Tom Borrelli Award

Olympic medalists 

Alpine skiing
Archery
Athletics: men and women
Badminton
Baseball
Basketball
Biathlon
Bobsleigh
Boxing
Canoeing: men and women
Cross-country skiing
Curling
Cycling: men and women
Diving
Equestrian
Fencing: men and women
Field hockey
Figure skating
Football
Freestyle skiing
Gymnastics: men and women
Handball: men and women
Ice hockey
Judo
Luge
Modern pentathlon
Nordic combined
Rowing: men and women
Sailing
Shooting
Short track speed skating
Skeleton
Ski jumping
Snowboarding
Softball
Speed skating
Swimming: men and women
Synchronized swimming
Table tennis
Taekwondo
Tennis
Triathlon
Volleyball
Water polo: men and women
Weightlifting
Wrestling: freestyle and Greco-Roman

Paralympic medalists 

Alpine skiing
Wheelchair curling

Rugby league 

1989 League Legends Cup awarded to the winner of the annual match between National Rugby League clubs the Canberra Raiders and the Wests Tigers
Albert Goldthorpe Medal award to the Super League player of the year by Rugby Leaguer & League Express magazine
Auckland Rugby League club trophies prizes, medals, and awards won by clubs of the Auckland Rugby League
Clive Churchill Medal awarded to the annual National Rugby League Grand final's man-of-the-match
Cronulla-Sutherland Sharks Honours prizes, medals, and awards of the National Rugby League team Cronulla-Sutherland Sharks
Dally M Awards the National Rugby League's official annual awards ceremony
Dally M Medal player of the season
List of Dally M Awards winners
Foley Shield awarded to the winners of the annual inter-city competition of North Queensland
Harry Sunderland Trophy awarded to the annual Super League Grand final's man-of-the-match
The Immortals the top six players in Australian history according to Rugby League Week
J. J. Giltinan Shield awarded annually to the National Rugby League season's minor premiers
Jack Gibson Cup awarded to the winner of the annual match between National Rugby League clubs the Parramatta Eels and Sydney Roosters clubs
Johnny Mannah Cup awarded to the winner of the annual match between National Rugby League clubs the Cronulla-Sutherland Sharks and Sydney Roosters clubs
Lance Todd Trophy awarded to the annual Challenge Cup Final's man-of-the-match
League Leader's Shield awarded annually to Super League's leaders at the end of the regular season
Mal Meninga Medal awarded to the Canberra Raiders player of the year
Man of Steel Awards awarded annually to the Super League player of the year
RLIF Awards the Rugby League International Federation's annual awards ceremony
Ron Coote Cup awarded to the winner of the annual match between National Rugby League clubs the South Sydney Rabbitohs and Sydney Roosters clubs
Rothmans Medal awarded annually to the best and fairest player of the New South Wales Rugby League and the Brisbane Rugby League
Royal Agricultural Society Shield awarded to the annual winners of the New South Wales Rugby League premiership in its early years
Charity Shield (NRL) awarded to the winner of an annual pre-season match between National Rugby League clubs the South Sydney Rabbitohs and St George Illawarra Dragons
Rugby League World Golden Boot Award awarded annually to the player of the year according to Rugby League World magazine
South Sydney Rabbitohs competition honours prizes, medals, and awards of the National Rugby League team South Sydney Rabbitohs
Super League Dream Team
Thacker Shield awarded annually to the winner of a match between the champion clubs of the Canterbury Rugby League and West Coast Rugby League
Wally Lewis Medal awarded annually to the player of the State of Origin series

Rugby union

Domestic trophies 

 European:
European Rugby Champions Cup – a competition involving leading club, regional, and provincial teams from England, France, Ireland, Italy, Scotland, and Wales
European Challenge Cup – the second-tier competition to the European Rugby Champions Cup
European Shield – a defunct repechage tournament for teams knocked out in the first round of the European Challenge Cup (no longer awarded)
Heineken Cup (no longer awarded) 
 France:
Bouclier de Brennus – to the champions of the Top 14 league
 Great Britain and Ireland:
Anglo-Welsh Cup – (aka LV Cup, a cup competition for English and Welsh top-level club teams)
British and Irish Cup – a cup competition for British and Irish semi-pro club teams
 New Zealand:
ITM Cup – New Zealand's annual professional domestic competition
Meads Cup – a cup played for between provincial teams during the Heartland Championship, the second-tier domestic league
Lochore Cup – the secondary trophy in the Heartland Championship
Ranfurly Shield – a trophy between provincial teams
 South Africa:
Currie Cup – South Africa's premier domestic competition
 Southern Hemisphere:
Super Rugby Trophy – to the winners of the Super Rugby competition

International two-team challenge trophies 

 Contested in the Six Nations:
Calcutta Cup – England and Scotland
Centenary Quaich – Ireland and Scotland
Giuseppe Garibaldi Trophy – France and Italy
Millennium Trophy – England and Ireland
 Contested in the Tri Nations:
Bledisloe Cup – Australia and New Zealand, also contested once a year outside the Tri Nations
Freedom Cup – New Zealand and South Africa
Mandela Challenge Plate – Australia and South Africa
 Other trophies:
Antim Cup – Georgia and Romania
Cook Cup – Australia and England
Dave Gallaher Trophy – France and New Zealand
Elgon Cup – Kenya and Uganda
Hillary Shield – England and New Zealand
Hopetoun Cup – Australia and Scotland
James Bevan Trophy – Australia and Wales
Lansdowne Cup – Australia and Ireland
Prince William Cup – South Africa and Wales
Puma Trophy – Argentina and Australia
Tom Richards Trophy – Australia and the British and Irish Lions
Trophée des Bicentenaires – Australia and France

IRB Awards 
IRB Awards (includes two awards given by the International Rugby Players' Association as part of the awards program):

 IRB Development Award
 IRB International Coach of the Year
 IRB International Player of the Year
 IRB International Sevens Player of the Year
 IRB International Team of the Year
 IRB International Women's Personality of the Year
 IRB Junior Player of the Year
 IRB Referee Award for Distinguished Service
 IRB Spirit of Rugby Award
 IRPA Special Merit Award
 IRPA Try of the Year
Melrose Cup – to the winners of the Rugby World Cup Sevens
Webb Ellis Cup – to the winners of the Rugby World Cup

Sailing 

Awards:
ISAF World Sailor of the Year
Trophies:
America's Cup
Sailing World Cup
Volvo ocean race

Tennis 

Grand Slam trophies:
Australian Open
French Open
US Open
Wimbledon
World championship trophies:
Davis Cup
Fed Cup
Hopman Cup

Water polo 

Montenegrin Water Polo Cup, national water polo cup played in Montenegro
Greek Water Polo Cup
Croatian Water Polo Cup
Asian Water Polo Cup
Serbian Water Polo Cup
FINA Water Polo World Cup of the Fédération Internationale de Natation

Other sports 

Ashburton Shield; rifle shooting (National Rifle Association (United Kingdom))
Biathlon World Championships
Billiard Congress of America Hall of Fame
Boston Marathon
Callahan Award
Commonwealth Games
Elcho Shield; rifle shooting (National Rifle Association (United Kingdom))
ESPY Award
FIS Alpine Ski World Cup
Golden Goggle Awards; swimming
Harmsworth Trophy; powerboating
Leech Cup; long range shooting (National Rifle Association of America)
Mug Cup; river racing
NOGI Awards; underwater diving
Slammy Award
Waterloo Cup; coursing
Wimbledon Cup; long range shooting (National Rifle Association of America)
World MMA Awards

References